The 1981 Texas Longhorns baseball team represented the University of Texas at Austin in the 1981 NCAA Division I baseball season. The Longhorns played their home games at Disch–Falk Field. The team was coached by Cliff Gustafson in his 14th season at Texas.

The Longhorns reached the College World Series, finishing third with wins over Michigan, Miami (FL) and eventual runner-up Oklahoma State and a pair of losses to eventual champion Arizona State.

Personnel

Roster

Schedule and results

References

Texas Longhorns baseball seasons
Texas Longhorns
Southwest Conference baseball champion seasons
College World Series seasons
Texas Longhorns
Southwest Conference Baseball Tournament champion seasons